Nalla Neram Tamil soap opera that aired on Zee Tamil. The show launched 26 August 2013 and aired Monday through Friday at 7:30PM Indian Standard Time. The show starred by S. Kavitha, Balasingh, Ragavi, Vasuvikiram, Ajay Rathnam and Shamila.

The show was produced by Thevar Films and the title was derived from the M. G. Ramachandran film of same name which was produced by them in the past, and directed by R. Thyagarajan. The story is about a boy who leaves his family and a little elephant which leaves the forest. They meet each other and become friends with unconditional love. The show last aired on 7 February 2014 and ended with 122 episodes.

Plot 
Velu is a chirpy tiny tot of eight years, and who is the pet of all the family members... his gestures and actions are always cheerful and lively. He hates books and loves nature.. the verdant forests and the greenery are something that keeps on fascinating him. Ramu, a sweet and lovable elephant, is nothing less than a human. In displaying the most intricate of emotions, Ramu breaks all the barriers of pet-animal-bonding and enjoys a spirit of oneness with the tiny tot, Velu.

Cast 
 S. Kavitha
 Balasingh
 Vasuvikiram
 Shamily Sukumar
 Kutty Ramesh
 Ajay Rathnam
 Sarathchanthiran
 Ragavi
 M. Mohanapriya
 Sripriya
 Kobi

References

External links 
 

Zee Tamil original programming
Tamil-language children's television series
2013 Tamil-language television series debuts
Tamil-language television shows
2014 Tamil-language television series endings
Television shows set in Tamil Nadu